Edward George Bruton (17 February 1826 – 3 August 1899) was a British Gothic Revival architect who practised in Oxford. He was made an Associate of the Royal Institute of British Architects (RIBA) in 1855 and a Fellow of the RIBA in 1861.

Born in Holywell, Oxford in 1826, the son of Richard Bruton, the Common Room Man at New College, and his wife Ruth, he was apprenticed to the architect John Plowman by the time of the 1841 census.

He is buried in St Sepulchre's Cemetery, Oxford.

Work
Saint Sepulchre's Cemetery, Oxford: lodge (designed as part of the original plan in 1848, but not built until 1865)
Saint Paul, Walton Street, Oxford: added apse, 1853
Town Hall, Banbury, Oxfordshire, 1854
Saint Nicholas, Islip, Oxfordshire: restoration, 1861
Girls' School, Winslow, Buckinghamshire: school, 1864
62 Banbury Road, Oxford: house, 1864–65
Christ Church Old Buildings, The Hamel, Oxford: tenement block, 1866
Saint Mary, Black Bourton, Oxfordshire: restoration, 1866
64 Banbury Road, Oxford: house, 1868–69
Chapel of Cowley Middle Class School, Oxford Military College, Cowley, Oxfordshire, 1870
Saint John the Evangelist, New Hinksey, Oxfordshire: church, 1870 (demolished 1900)
Saint Bartholomew, Ducklington, Oxfordshire: restoration, 1871
Rewley House, Wellington Square, Oxford: house, 1872
Saints Peter and Paul, Broadwell, Oxfordshire: restoration, 1873
Saint Nicholas, Emmington, Oxfordshire: enlarged rectory, 1873
Saint Mary, Hardwick, West Oxfordshire: rebuilt church, 1874
Saint John the Baptist, Stadhampton, Oxfordshire: rebuilt church and added south aisle, 1875
Saint Michael's Infants' School, New Inn Hall Street, Oxford, 1876
Saint Mary, Chipping Norton, Oxfordshire: vicarage, 1880
The Grange, Little Tew, Oxfordshire: new wing, 1880

St Edburg's Hall, London Road, Bicester, Oxfordshire: 1882
Saint Bartholomew, Holton, Oxfordshire: vicarage, 1882
Saints Peter and Paul, Aston Rowant, Oxfordshire: restoration, 1884
Saint Andrew, Oddington, Oxfordshire: restoration, 1886
All Saints, Spelsbury, Oxfordshire: remodelled rectory, 1886
Covered Market, High Street, Oxford: roofs, 1886–97
Saint Mary, Souldern, Oxfordshire: rectory, 1890

References

Sources

1826 births
1899 deaths
19th-century English architects
Architects from Oxford
Gothic Revival architects
English ecclesiastical architects
Associates of the Royal Institute of British Architects
Burials at St Sepulchre's Cemetery